The Cadillac Eldorado is a luxury car manufactured and marketed by Cadillac from 1952 until 2002 over twelve generations.

The Eldorado was at or near the top of the Cadillac line. The original 1953 Eldorado convertible and the Eldorado Brougham models of 1957–1960 had distinct bodyshells and were the most expensive models that Cadillac offered those years. The Eldorado was never less than second in price after the Cadillac Series 75 limousine until 1966.  Starting in 1967 the Eldorado retained its premium position in the Cadillac price structure, but was manufactured in high volumes on a unique, two-door personal luxury car platform.

The Eldorado carried the Fleetwood designation from 1965 through 1972, and was a modern revival of the pre-war Cadillac V-12 and Cadillac V-16 roadsters and convertibles.

Name
The nameplate Eldorado is a contraction of two Spanish words that translate as "the gilded (i.e., golden) one" — and also refers to El Dorado, the mythical Colombian "Lost City of Gold" that fascinated Spanish explorers.

Chosen in an internal competition for a 1952 concept vehicle celebrating Cadillac's golden anniversary, the name Eldorado was subsequently adopted for a limited-edition convertible for model year 1953.

Cadillac began using the nameplates "Eldorado Seville", after the city in southern Spain, and "Eldorado Biarritz" after the luxury seaside resort in southern France, to distinguish between the hardtop and convertible models (respectively) while both were offered, from 1956 through 1960 inclusively. The "Seville" name was dropped when the hardtop was initially discontinued (1961), but the Biarritz name continued through 1964. Beginning in 1965, the Eldorado became the 'Fleetwood Eldorado'. 'Biarritz' returned as an up level trim package for the Eldorado for 1976 until 1991.

First generation (1953)

The Cadillac Series 62 Eldorado joined the Oldsmobile 98 Fiesta, and Buick Roadmaster Skylark as top-of-the-line, limited-production specialty convertibles introduced in 1953 by General Motors to promote its design leadership. A special-bodied, low-production convertible (532 units in total), it was the production version of the 1952 El Dorado "Golden Anniversary" concept car.  Along with borrowing bumper bullets from the 1951 GM Le Sabre show car, it featured a full assortment of deluxe accessories and introduced the wraparound windshield and a cut-down beltline to Cadillac standard production.

The expansive frontal glass and distinctive dip in the sheet metal at the bottom of the side windows (featured on one or both of GM's other 1953 specialty convertibles) were especially beloved by General Motors' styling chief Harley Earl and subsequently widely copied by other marques. Available in four unique colors; Aztec Red, Alpine White, Azure Blue and Artisan Ochre. Convertible tops were available in either black or white Orlon. AC was an option at US$620 ($ in  dollars ), as were wire wheels for US$325 ($ in  dollars ). The car carried no special badging other than a gold-colored "Eldorado" nameplate in the center of the dash. A hard tonneau cover, flush with the rear deck, hid the convertible top when stored.

Although technically a subseries of the Cadillac Series 62 based on the regular Series 62 convertible and sharing its engine, it was nearly twice as expensive at US$7,750 ($ in  dollars ) as the all-new Packard Caribbean convertible.

Only 532 were produced, comprising just 0.5% of Cadillac's 1953 sales.

Second generation (1954–1956)

In 1954 the Eldorado lost its unique sheetmetal in an effort by GM to lower its price in order to increase sales.  Now sharing its basic body shell with standard Cadillacs, it was distinguished mainly by trim pieces, including golden identifying crests centered directly behind the air-slot fender breaks, and wide fluted beauty panels to decorate the lower rear sides. These panels were made of extruded aluminum, and also appeared on a one of a kind Eldorado coupé built for the Reynolds Aluminum Corporation. Also included in the production Eldorado convertible were monogram plates on the doors, wire wheels, and custom interior trimmings with the Cadillac crest embossed on the seat bolsters.  Sales nearly quadrupled at a much more modest US$5,738 base price (equivalent to $ in  dollars ), with a total of 2,150 Eldorado's sold.

For 1955, the Eldorado's body gained its own rear end styling with somewhat higher, more slender, and distinctly pointed tailfins, a styling change that portended extreme exaggerations to come. The Eldorado sport convertible featured extras such as wide chrome body belt moldings and twin round taillights halfway up the fenders. Sales nearly doubled to 3,950.

For 1956, a two-door hardtop coupé version was released, called the "Eldorado Seville", and a two-door convertible named "Eldorado Biarritz". An Eldorado script appeared with fender crest on the car, which was further distinguished by twin hood ornaments. An extra feature on the Eldorado convertible was a ribbed chrome saddle molding extending from the windshield to the rear window pillar along the beltline. With the addition of the Seville, sales rose yet again, by 60% to 6,050 of which 2,150 were Sevilles. Still the division's halo car, Eldorados accounted for just 4% of all Cadillacs sold.

Third generation (1957–1958)

Cadillac was restyled and re-engineered for 1957, with stylistic updates in 1958.

1957
1957 saw the Eldorado (in both Biarritz convertible and Seville hardtop body styles) receive new styling with an exclusive rear-end design featuring a low, downswept fenderline capped by pointed in-board fins. Just behind the open rear wheel housings the lower rear quarters were trimmed with broad, sculptured stainless steel beauty panels that visually blended into the split rear wraparound bumper assemblies. A form of this unique rear-end treatment first appeared (sans fins) on the Cadillac "Interceptor" prototype from the immediate post-war era. Series 62 Eldorados (as distinct from the Series 70 Eldorado Brougham) were further distinguished by the model name above a V-shaped rear deck ornament and on the front fenders. The three section front bumper was shared with the rest of the redesigned Cadillac model line, as in previous years the Eldorados came with a long list of standard features. Four specially-built 4-door hardtop Eldorado Sevilles were also built in 1957.

1958
For 1958, the car received quad headlights as the front clip was again shared with this year's updated standard Cadillacs. GM was promoting their fiftieth year of production, and introduced Anniversary models for each brand; Cadillac, Buick, Oldsmobile, Pontiac, and Chevrolet. The 1958 models shared a common appearance on the top models for each brand; Cadillac Eldorado Seville, Buick Limited Riviera, Oldsmobile Starfire 98, Pontiac Bonneville Catalina, and the all-new Chevrolet Bel-Air Impala.

This year's revised front clip incorporated a new hood, a new front bumper with "dagmars" mounted lower and further apart combined with a full width jeweled grille. On the Biarritz and Seville, a V-shaped ornament and model identification script was asymmetrically mounted to the deck lid. Other styling updates included the addition of ten vertical chrome slashes ahead of the open rear wheel housings and crest medallions on the flank of the tailfins. The split rear bumper assemblies were each updated with a low-profile combined reverse light/grille unit that replaced the previous year's separate, round exhaust exits and reverse lights; the round brake/tail light units at the base of the fins remained unchanged. The rear license plate housing was now flanked on each side by five vertical hash marks.

1957–58 Eldorado Brougham

Announced in December 1956 and released around March 1957, the Series 70 Eldorado Brougham was a distinct, hand-built four-door ultra-luxury vehicle, derived from the Park Avenue and Orleans show cars of 1953–54. Designed by Ed Glowacke, Cadillac's 1950s design studio head, it stood out by featuring the first quad headlights – at the time still illegal in the United States, and other unique trim, foremost a brushed stainless steel pillarless hardtop. Like the later 1961 fourth-generation Lincoln Continental, it had rear-hinged rear doors (suicide doors) but unlike the Continental, the Brougham was a true pillarless hardtop as the doors latched onto a stub pillar that did not extend beyond the beltline.

It cost US$13,074 ($ in  dollars ) — twice the price of a conventional 1957 Eldorado and more than competitors Rolls-Royce Silver Cloud, Facel Vega Excellence or Continental Mark II. Sales were 400 in 1957 and 304 in 1958. 1958 was the last year for the domestic production of the handbuilt Brougham at Cadillac's Detroit factory, as future manufacturing of the special bodies was transferred to Pininfarina of Turin, Italy. It was a marketing approach revival used in the early 1930s with the Cadillac V-16 with similar attention to detail and engineering pursuits as a halo car.

The car featured a roof trimmed in brushed stainless and self leveling air suspension. The exterior ornamentation included wide, polished lower rear quarter beauty panels extending along the rocker sills and rectangularly sculptured side body "cove" highlighted with five horizontal windsplits on the rear doors. Tail styling treatments followed the Eldorado pattern. It also had the first automatic two-position "memory" power seats, a dual four-barrel V-8, low-profile tires with thin white-walls, automatic trunk opener, cruise control, high-pressure cooling system, polarized sun visors, electric antenna, automatic-release parking brake, electric door locks and a dual heating system. Other unique features included an automatic starter with restart function, Autronic Eye, drum-type electric clock, power windows, forged aluminum wheels and air conditioning, six silver magnetic glovebox drink tumblers and finally, an Evans leather trimmed cigarette case and vanity kit containing a lipstick holder, ladies' powder puff with powder, comb, beveled mirror, coin holder, matching leather notebook, gold mechanical pencil, atomizer filled with Arpège Extrait De Lanvin perfume. Buyers of Broughams had a choice of 44 full-leather interior and trim combinations and could select such items as Mouton, Karakul or lambskin carpeting.

There were serious difficulties with the air suspension, which proved troublesome in practice. Some owners found it cheaper to have it replaced with conventional coil springs.

The 1957 Eldorado Brougham joined the Sixty Special and the Series 75 as the only Cadillac models with Fleetwood bodies although Fleetwood script or crests did not appear anywhere on the exterior of the car, and so this would also mark the first time in 20 years that a Fleetwood-bodied car was paired with the Brougham name.

The 1957-58 Eldorado Brougham also marked the return of the Cadillac Series 70, if only briefly. An all-transistor signal-seeking car radio was produced by GM's Delco radio and was first available for the 1957 Eldorado Brougham models, which was standard equipment and used 13 transistors in its circuitry.

The Eldorado Brougham received minor changes for 1958. The interior upper door panels were finished in leather instead of the metal finish used in 1957. New wheel covers also appeared. Forty-four trim combinations were available, along with 15 special monotone paint colors.

Fourth generation (1959–1960)

1959
Along with the rest of the General Motors divisions, the bulky, originally proposed 1959 styling was abandoned in favor of a significantly lower, longer and wider theme as an overdue response to Virgil Exner's striking redesign of the 1957 Chrysler products. The 1959 Cadillac is remembered for its huge sharp tailfins with dual bullet tail lights, two distinctive rooflines and roof pillar configurations, new jewel-like grille patterns and matching deck lid beauty panels.

For 1959 the Series 62 became the Series 6200. De Villes and two-door Eldorados were moved from the Series 62 to their own series, the Series 6300 and Series 6400 respectively, though they all, including the four-door Eldorado Brougham (which was moved from the Series 70 to Series 6900), shared the same  wheelbase. New mechanical items were a "scientifically engineered" drainage system and new shock absorbers. All Eldorados were characterized by a three-deck, jeweled, rear grille insert that replicated the texture of the front grille; this front/rear grille treatment was shared with the Fleetwood Sixty Special and would continue through 1966 with textures being revised each year. The Seville and Biarritz models had the Eldorado name spelled out behind the front wheel opening and featured broad, full-length body sill highlights that curved over the rear fender profile and back along the upper beltline region. Engine output was an even  from the  engine. Standard equipment included power brakes, power steering, automatic transmission, back-up lamps, windshield wipers, two-speed wipers, wheel discs, outside rearview mirror, vanity mirror, oil filter, power windows, six way power seats, heater, fog lamps, remote control deck lid, radio and antenna with rear speaker, power vent windows, air suspension, electric door locks and license frames. The Eldorado Brougham also came with air conditioning, automatic headlight dimmer, and cruise control standard over the Seville and Biarritz trim lines.

1960
1960 Cadillacs resemble 1959 Cadillacs, but with much lower tailfins and smoother, more restrained styling.

General changes included a full-width grille, the elimination of pointed front bumper guards, increased restraint in the application of chrome trim, lower tailfins minus the twin bullet taillamps, oval shaped nacelles and front fender mounted directional indicator lamps. External variations on the Seville two-door hardtop and Biarritz convertible took the form of bright body sill highlights that extended across the lower edge of fender skirts and Eldorado block lettering on the sides of the front fenders, just behind the headlamps. Standard equipment included power brakes, power steering, automatic transmission, dual back-up lamps, windshield wipers, two-speed wipers, wheel discs, outside rearview mirror, vanity mirror, oil filter, power windows, six-way power seats, heater, fog lamps, Eldorado engine, remote control trunk lock, radio with antenna and rear speaker, power vent windows, air suspension, electric door locks, license frames, and five whitewall tires. Technical highlights were finned rear drums and an X-frame construction. Interiors were done in Chadwick cloth or optional Chambray cloth and leather combinations. The last Eldorado Seville was built in 1960.

The 1960 Cadillac Eldorado Biarritz 6467E is featured as Maurice Minnifield's vehicle in the 1990s television series Northern Exposure.

1959–60 Eldorado Brougham
For model years 1959 and 1960, the Eldorado Brougham became longer, lower and wider. The Brougham featured narrow taillights integrated into low tailfins; an angular rear roofline with rear ventiplanes that contrasted to the rounded roofline; and the dual rocket-like taillights and tall fins of the standard 1959 models. Front and rear bumper assemblies were shared with the standard Cadillacs.

Designed in-house, Cadillac contracted with Pininfarina of Turin, Italy for the manufacture of the low-volume model. The Eldorado Broughams were among the first Cadillacs to be hand-built in Italy; concept cars were also hand built as needed. Cadillac chassis were sent by boat to the port of Savona, Italy where they were then delivered to the factory in Turin at Grugliasco, mated with the body and sent back to Detroit by boat.

Priced at $13,075 ($ in  dollars ), the Brougham cost $1 more than their older siblings and did not sell as well as their forebears.

A vertical crest medallion with Brougham script plate appeared on the front fenders and a single, thin molding ran from the front to rear along the mid-sides of the body. The Brougham did not have Eldorado front fender letters or Eldorado-specific body edge highlight trim. For 1960 new standard model bumpers were incorporated and a fin-like crest or skeg ran from behind the front wheel opening to the rear of the car on the lower bodyside with the crest medallions relocated to the trailing edge of the rear fenders. The standard equipment list matched those of other Eldorados, plus Cruise Control, Autronic Eye, air conditioning and E-Z Eye glass.

The Eldorado Brougham was moved to its own unique Series 6900 from Series 70 for its remaining two years.

Fifth generation (1961–1962)

1961
All Cadillacs were restyled and re-engineered for 1961. The Eldorado Biarritz convertible (6367) was technically reclassified as a subseries of the De Ville (Series 6300), a status it would keep through 1964. An Eldorado convertible would remain in the Cadillac line through 1966, but its differences from the rest of the line would be generally more modest. The new convex jewelled grille slanted back towards both the bumper and the hood lip, along the horizontal plane, and sat between dual headlamps. New rear-slanting front pillars with a reverse-curved base as first used on the 1959-60 Broughams with a somewhat less expansive windshield was incorporated. The Eldorado Biarritz featured front series designation scripts and a lower body "skeg" trimmed with a thin three quarter length spear molding running from behind the front wheel opening to the rear of the car.
Standard equipment included power brakes, power steering, automatic transmission, dual reverse lights, vanity mirror, power windows, 6-way power bench seat, power vent windows. whitewall tires. Options; bucket seats, RH outside rearview mirror remote control trunk lock and a trumpet horn.
Rubber-isolated front and rear coil springs replaced the trouble prone air suspension system. Four-barrel induction systems were now the sole power choice and dual exhaust were no longer available. With the Seville and Brougham gone, sales fell to 1,450.

1962
A mild facelift characterized Cadillac styling trends for 1962. A flatter, upright grille with a thicker horizontal center bar and more delicate cross-hatched insert appeared. Ribbed chrome trim panel, seen ahead of the front wheel housings in 1961, were now replaced with cornering lamps and front fender model and series identification badges were eliminated. More massive front bumper end pieces appeared and housed rectangular parking lamps. At the rear tail lamps were now housed in vertically oriented rectangular nacelles designed with an angled peak at the center. A vertically ribbed rear beauty panel replicating the grille treatment appeared on the deck lid latch panel. Cadillac script also appeared on the lower left side of the grille. Standard equipment included all of last year's equipment plus remote controlled outside rearview mirror, heater and defroster and front cornering lamps. Cadillac refined the ride and quietness, with more insulation in the floor and behind the firewall.

Sixth generation (1963–1964)

1963
In 1963, the Eldorado Biarritz joined the Cadillac Sixty Special and the Cadillac Series 75 as the only Cadillac models with Fleetwood bodies, thus acquiring the Fleetwood wreath and crest on its rear quarters and Fleetwood rocker panel moldings. The 1963 Eldorado was also the first Fleetwood bodied convertible since the Cadillac Series 75 stopped offering four- and two-door convertible body styles and production of the Cadillac Series 90 (V16) ceased in 1941. In overall terms the 1963 Cadillac was essentially the same as the previous year. The completely redesigned body imparted a bolder and more angular look. The front fenders projected 4.625 inches further forward than in 1962 while the tailfins were trimmed down somewhat to provide a lower profile. Body side sculpturing was eliminated in favor of smooth, flatter slab sides. The slightly V-shaped radiator grille was taller and now incorporated outer extensions that swept below the dual headlamps and housed small circular front parking lamps. The Eldorado also had a rectangular front and rear grille pattern that it again shared with the Fleetwood Sixty Special. A total of 143 options including bucket seats with wool, leather or nylon upholstery fabrics and wood veneer facings on dash, doors and seatbacks, set an all-time record for interior appointment choices. Standard equipment was the same as the previous year.

1964
The Eldorado received a minor facelift for 1964. The main visual cue indicating an Eldorado Biarritz rather than a De Ville convertible was simply the lack of fender skirts. New up front was a bi-angular grille that formed a V-shape along both its vertical and horizontal planes bisected by a central body-colored horizontal bar. Outer grille extension panels again housed the parking and cornering lamps. It was the 17th consecutive year for the Cadillac tailfins with a new fine-blade design carrying on the tradition. Performance improvements including a larger 429 cubic inch V8 engine were the dominant changes for the model run. Equipment features were same as in 1963 for the most part. Comfort Control, a completely automatic heating and air conditioning system controlled by a dial thermostat on the instrument panel, was introduced as an industry first. Performance gains from the new engine showed best in the lower range, at  traffic driving speeds. A new technical feature was the Turbo-Hydramatic transmission, also used in the De Ville and the Sixty Special. Series 62, 75. and the Commercial Chassis continued with the old Hydra-Matic until 1965.

Seventh generation (1965–1966)

For 1965, the Eldorado gained Cadillac's Fleetwood designation, marketed as the Fleetwood Eldorado, in a similar fashion to the Fleetwood Series 75 and the Fleetwood Sixty Special. The Biarritz nomenclature was finally dropped from sales literature, probably because there was no need to distinguish the convertible from the long defunct Eldorado Seville and Brougham (The Biarritz nameplate would be revived in 1976 as a trim option for the Eldorado coupe). This was the last generation Eldorado to be equipped with rear wheel drive.

The redesigned Eldorado still rode on the same  wheelbase. The elevated tailfins became slightly downward-sloping, and sharp, distinct body lines replaced the rounded look. Also new were a straight rear bumper and vertical lamp clusters. The headlight pairs switched from horizontal to vertical, thus permitting a wider grille. Curved frameless side windows appeared with a tempered glass backlight. New standard features included lamps for luggage and glove compartments and front and rear safety belts. Power was still supplied by the 340 horsepower  V8. Perimeter frame construction allowed repositioning the engine six inches forward in the frame, thus lowering the transmission hump and increasing interior room.

In 1966, changes included a somewhat coarser mesh for the radiator grille insert, which was now divided by a thick, bright metal horizontal center bar housing rectangular parking lamps at the outer ends. Separate rectangular side marker lamps replaced the integral grille extension designs. There was generally less chrome on all Cadillac models this year. Cadillac "firsts" this season included variable ratio power steering and optional front seats with carbon cloth heating pads built into the cushions and seatbacks. Comfort and convenience innovations were headrests, reclining seats and an AM/FM stereo system. Automatic level control was available. Engineering improvements made to the perimeter frame increased ride and handling ease. Newly designed piston and oil rings and a new engine mounting system and patented quiet exhaust were used.

Eighth generation (1967–1970)

The Eldorado was radically redesigned for 1967 as a front-wheel drive hardtop coupe, becoming the brand's first entry to capitalize on the era's burgeoning personal luxury car market. Promoted as a "personal" Cadillac, it shared the E-body with the second-generation Buick Riviera and the first-generation Oldsmobile Toronado, which had been introduced the previous year.

To enhance its distinctiveness, Cadillac adapted the Toronado's front-wheel drive unified powerplant package, mating a Cadillac 429 V8 to a Turbo-Hydramatic 425 automatic transmission. Disc brakes were optional, and new standard safety equipment included an energy absorbing steering column and generously padded instrument panel.

The 1967 Eldorado was a great departure from previous generations, which shared styling with Cadillac's De Ville and Series 62, the exceptions being the rare 1953 model, and the even more rare 1957-60 Eldorado Brougham. The front drive Eldorado's crisp styling, initiated by GM styling chief Bill Mitchell, was distinctive and unique, more angular than the streamlined Riviera and Toronado. The rear end was inspired by the GM-X Stiletto concept car. This was the only production Cadillac to be equipped with concealed headlights behind vacuum operated doors.

Performance was 0–60 mph (0–97 km/h) in less than nine seconds and a top speed of 120 mph (192 km/h). Roadability and handling were highly praised by contemporary reviews, and sales were excellent despite high list prices. Its sales of 17,930 units, nearly three times the previous Eldorado high, helped give Cadillac its best year ever.

In 1968, the Eldorado received Cadillac's new  (SAE gross) Cadillac 472 V8 (7.7 L) V8, and disc brakes became standard.  Only slight exterior changes were made to comply with new federal safety legislation. Sales set another record at 24,528, with Eldorados accounting for nearly 11% of all Cadillacs sold.

In 1969, hidden headlamps were eliminated, a halo vinyl roof was available as an option, as was a rim-blow steering wheel – the only year Cadillac offered it.

A power sunroof was a newly available option for 1970. Styling changes for 1970 included a longer hood, a new grille with '8.2 Litre' notification and new taillamp bezels with thin lenses.

Ninth generation (1971–1978)

The 1971 Eldorado was substantially redesigned, growing two inches in length, six in wheelbase and featuring standard fender skirts, all of which gave the car a much heavier appearance than the previous generation. The 500 cu in (8.2 L) V8 engine remained an Eldorado exclusive.

A convertible Eldorado was also offered for 1971, the first in the line since 1966. Door glass remained frameless, and the hardtop rear quarter windows were deleted, replaced by a fixed "opera window" in the widened "C" pillar. A stand-up wreath and crest hood ornament was new this year.

Inside, there was a new curved instrument panel and redesigned seats. A fiber-optic "lamp monitor" system, which displayed the functionality of the headlamps, taillamps, parking lamps, turn signals and brakelights was mounted on each front fender and the shelf below the rear window. This  wheelbase version Eldorado would run through 1978, receiving major facelifts in 1973, 1974 and 1975. Sales in 1971 set a new record at 27,368.

Changes were minimal for 1972; the most noticeable exterior change was a new 'Eldorado' script, replacing the block 'Eldorado' lettering on the front fenders a trunk lid. Sales for 1972 increased to 40,074.

In 1973, the Eldorado was removed from the Fleetwood series and reestablished as its own series. The 1973 models received a major facelift, featuring a massive egg-crate grille, new front and rear bumpers, decklid, rear fenders and taillamps. Interiors featured new "soft pillow" door panels, with larger, sturdier pull-straps. The rear "lamp monitor" display which showed the driver the function of the turn signal, brake and taillamps, was relocated (except on the convertible) from the rear shelf, to the headliner just above the rear glass.

The Cadillac Eldorado was chosen as the official pace car for the Indianapolis 500 in 1973. Cadillac produced 566 of these special pace car convertibles. Thirty-three were used at the track during the race week, with the remainder distributed to U.S. Cadillac dealers one per dealership. Sales of the Eldorado coupe and convertible soared to 51,451 the highest total for the model during the 1970s and over a sixth of all Cadillac sales for 1973.

The lengthened wheelbase reduced performance relative to contemporary premium personal luxury cars, but offered comfortable seating for six adults rather than just four.

1974 Eldorados featured a redesigned rear bumper with vertical ends, housing sidemarker lamps. This new bumper was designed to meet the new 5 mile impact federal design regulation. Other styling changes included new horizontal taillamps placed beneath the trunk lid, a new fine mesh grille with Cadillac script on the header and new standard wheel covers. Inside, there was a redesigned two-tier instrument panel, marketed in sales literature as "space age" and shared with all 1974 Cadillacs.
A new, quartz controlled digital clock, an "information band" of warning lights and the fuel gauge ran horizontally along the upper tier of this new instrument panel.

For 1975, the Eldorado was given rectangular headlamps, a new egg-crate grille, full rear wheel openings sans fender skirts and sharper, crisper lines resulting in a sleeker appearance reminiscent of the 1967–70 models.

1976 was to be the final year for the Eldorado convertible and the car was heavily promoted by General Motors as "the last American convertible". Some 14,000 would be sold, many purchased as investments. The final 200 convertibles were designated as "Bicentennial Edition" commemorating America's 200th birthday. All 200 of these cars were identical, painted white with a dual red/blue pinstripe along the upper bodyside and inside, a commemorative plaque was mounted on the dashboard. When Cadillac reintroduced the Eldorado convertible for the 1984 model year, several customers who had purchased 1976 Eldorado convertibles as investments, felt they had been deceived and launched an unsuccessful class action lawsuit against General Motors.
Having received a major facelift the previous year, the Eldorado for 1976 received only minor styling changes, including a new grille, a small Cadillac script on the hood face, revised taillamp lenses and new black painted wheel covers.

For 1977, the Eldorado again received a new grille with a finer crosshatch pattern. New vertical taillamps were relocated to the chrome bumper-fender extensions. New 'Eldorado' block-lettering appeared on the hood face and new rectangular side marker lights with 'Eldorado' block-lettering replaced the 'Eldorado' script on the rear fenders. The convertible was dropped (although Custom Coach of Lima, Ohio converted a few 1977 and 1978 Eldorados into convertibles using salvaged parts from earlier models). The mammoth 500 cu in. (8.2L) V8 of 1970–76 was replaced by a new 425 cu in. (7L) V8 with  available in all 1977 Cadillacs, except the Seville.

A new grille was the only visible change for 1978; the Eldorado would be completely redesigned and downsized for 1979.

Eldorado Biarritz
Unlike the Fleetwood Brougham and De Ville,  which both boasted the opulent d'Elegance trim luxury package, Cadillac did not offer a similar option for the Eldorado until the 1976 model year with the introduction of the Biarritz (a name last used for the 1964 Eldorado convertible) package. The car featured unique exterior trim and the rear half of the cabriolet roof was covered with a heavily padded landau vinyl top accented with large "opera" lights. Body colored wheel covers were also featured.  The 1977–1978 interior featured "pillowed"-style, "tufted" leather seating, while the 1976 interior did not. As with other Cadillac models, special order contrasting upholstery piping and exterior colors were available.

The 1978 Biarritz option packages consisted of the Eldorado Custom Biarritz ($1,865); with Astroroof ($2,946); with sunroof ($2,746) and Eldorado Custom Biarritz Classic ($2,466); with Astroroof ($3,547); with sunroof ($3,347).

2000 Eldorado Custom Biarritz Classics were produced for 1978 only, in two-tone Arizona beige/demitasse brown consisting of 1,499 with no Astroroofs or no sunroofs; 475 with Astroroofs; 25 with sunroofs and one was produced with a power sliding T-top. Only nine of the latter are known to have been retrofitted by the American Sunroof Company under the direction of General Motors' Cadillac Motor Car Division.

The Biarritz option was available on the Eldorado through the 1991 model year and was replaced with the touring coupe (ETC)  option for 1992. Some of the original Biarritz styling cues vanished after 1985, such as the brushed stainless steel roofing (1979–85) and the plush "pillowed" interior seating designs, but the Biarritz remained unique.

Tenth generation (1979–1985)

The tenth generation Eldorado debuted in 1979, continuing as a rebadged variant of the Buick Riviera and Oldsmobile Toronado. This model was successful in terms of annual production totals compared with the ninth and eleventh generations.  The model set an all-time Eldorado sales record in 1984 of 77,806 (coupes and convertibles), accounting for about 26% of all Cadillacs sold.

Design
Independent rear suspension was adopted for the first time, helping retain rear-seat and trunk room in the smaller body. The most notable styling touch was an extreme notchback roofline. The Eldorado "Biarritz" model featured a stainless-steel roof, similar to the 1957–1958 Eldorado Brougham. The Eldorado featured frameless door glass, and rear quarter windows, similar to those from 1967 to 1970, without a thick "B" pillar. The Eldorado and the redesigned 1980 Cadillac Seville shared front wheel drive platforms. The cars were not true hardtops, as the rear quarter windows were fixed.

The Cadillac Trip Computer was available on the 1979 Eldorado. First offered on the 1978 Cadillac Seville, it provided electronic digital (LED) readouts for the speedometer, remaining fuel gallons, clock, and radio. No digital instrumentation was available for the 1980 Eldorado, apart from the climate control system. In 1981, full electronic "digital" instrumentation was an available option on the Eldorado and Seville. In addition to the digital electronic climate control that was standard on all Cadillacs, the standard analog speedometer and fuel gauges could be replaced with digital displays with features displaying gallons of remaining fuel and approximate range.

Engines
The tenth generation Eldorado was sold with multiple "malaise era" V8 engine variants, while offering a six cylinder for the first time in company history, a 4.1 L V6 sourced from Buick:

V8
The Eldorado was fitted with both gasoline engines – all of which operated on regular fuel – and a single diesel:

350
A smaller, more fuel efficient, Oldsmobile 350 ci (5.7 L) gasoline V8 replaced the 425 ci (7.0 L) engine from 1978.

368
In 1980, the standard engine became the Cadillac 368 ci V8 engine except in California, where the Oldsmobile 350 was still used. In both the 1980 Eldorado and Seville (which now shared frames) the 368s came with DEFI throttle body fuel injection.

4.1 L
For 1982, Cadillac unveiled the 4.1 L "High Technology" HT-4100. The performance was modest relative to older generations of the Eldorado.

This lightweight engine, used in all full-size 1982 Cadillacs (except limousines) was an in-house design that mated cast-iron heads to an aluminum block. Many HT-4100s were replaced under warranty because it was prone to failure of the intake manifold gasket due to scrubbing of the bi-metal interface, aluminum oil pump failure, cam bearing displacement, weak aluminum block castings and bolts pulling the aluminum threads from the block.

350 diesel
The Oldsmobile 350 ci diesel engine was available as an option.

V8-6-4
For 1981 only, the Eldorado was powered by Cadillac's V8-6-4 variable displacement variant of the 368 engine, which was designed to deactivate two or four cylinders when full power was not needed, helping meet GM's government fuel economy (CAFE) averages. It was a reduced bore version of the 1968 model-year 472, sharing that engine's stroke and also that of the model-years 1977–1979 425.

V6
In 1981-2 the Buick LC4 V6 was available.

Trim options
From 1982 through 1985, Cadillac offered the Eldorado Touring Coupe, with heavier duty "touring" suspension, aluminum alloy wheels, larger blackwall white-letter tires, cloisonné hood ornament, body-colored headlamp and taillamp bezels, wide-ribbed rocker moldings and available only with saddle leather interior and three exterior colors. These Eldorados were marketed as "drivers' cars" and included reclining front bucket seats with lumbar support, leather wrapped steering wheel, a center console and standard digital instrument cluster.

Late in the 1985 model year, an optional "Commemorative Edition" package was announced, in honor of the last year of production for this version of the Eldorado. Exclusive features included gold-tone script and tail-lamp emblems, specific sail panel badges, gold-background wheel center caps, and a Commemorative Edition badge on the steering wheel horn pad. Leather upholstery (available in dark blue or white, or a two-tone with dark blue and white) was included in the package, along with a dark blue dashboard and carpeting. Exterior colors were cotillion white or commodore blue.

Return of the Eldorado Convertible 
In 1984, eight years after Cadillac built its last convertible, the division temporarily resumed production of a convertible version of the Eldorado Biarritz. This car was not an aftermarket conversion, but a Cadillac division built convertible offered for the 1984-85 model years. The car was 200 pounds (91 kg) heavier, featuring the same interior as the Eldorado Biarritz coupe. The 1985 model year was also the last for the aftermarket Eldorado convertible made by the American Sunroof Corporation.

Prior to the "official" 1984 and 1985 Eldorado convertibles marketed by Cadillac, some 1979–1983 Eldorados were made into coach convertibles by independent coachbuilders e.g. ASC inc., Custom Coach (Lima, Ohio—this coachbuilder turned a few 1977 and 1978 Eldorados into convertibles) and Hess & Eisenhardt. The same coach-builders also offered Buick Riviera and Oldsmobile Toronado convertibles.

Production totals

Eleventh generation (1986–1991)

The higher fuel prices did not materialize, and with the 11th generation carrying a base price of $24,251, nearly 16% higher than the 1985 model, annual sales plummeted 72% from the last year of the previous generation. Observers noted the 11th generation was too small for Cadillac's traditional customers, yet still unable to attract buyers from the targeted competitors, e.g., BMW and Mercedes-Benz.

Buick and Oldsmobile's variants used Buick's 3.8 liter V6 engine, while the Eldorado continued to use the 4.1 liter V8.  Rear suspension used a single fiberglass transverse leaf spring for its fully independent rear end. Four wheel disc brakes were standard, as was electronic leveling. The interior featured a fully digital display, bucket seats with lumbar support, and cruise control. The optional Biarritz trim featured an upgraded interior.

1985's convertible body style was dropped to make way for the new Cadillac Allanté roadster. For the first time, the Eldorado no longer featured a hardtop body style, instead using framed door glass. Despite its smaller exterior size, the Eldorado's interior volume remained comparable to the previous generation.

Model year changes

1987
Aside from a longer, 5 year/50,000 mile warranty, the Eldorado was virtually unchanged for 1987, though with a price drop, to $23,740 ($ in  dollars ). The standard suspension, with new taller 75 series (previously 70) tires and hydro-elastic engine mounts, was slightly retuned for a softer ride, while the optional ($155) "touring suspension" ($ in  dollars ), with deflected-disc strut valves and 15-inch alloy wheels, remained for those desiring a firmer ride. As part of a federal requirement to discourage "chop-shop" thieves, major body panels were etched with the VIN. Also new, a combination cashmere cloth with leather upholstery, and locking inertia seat belt reels for rear seat passengers, which allowed for child-seat installation in the outboard seating positions in back. The formal cabriolet roof was added this year. Available for $495 on the base Eldorado, it featured a padded covering over the rear half of the roof, and turned the rear side glass into smaller opera windows. One of the Eldorado's most expensive standalone options was the Motorola cellular telephone mounted inside the locking center arm rest. Priced at $2,850 ($ in  dollars ), it had been reworked this year for easier operation, and featured a microphone mounted between the sun visors for hands-free operation. Additionally, the telephone featured a radio mute control: activated when the telephone and radio were in use at the same time, it automatically decreased the rear speaker's audio volume, and over-rode the front music speakers to be used for the hands-free telephone. The rectangular marker lamp, located on the bumper extension molding just behind the rear wheel well on 1986 and 1987 Eldorado models,  reappeared on the 1990 and 1991 Sevilles (base models only) and Eldorado Touring Coupés.

1988 facelift
The Eldorado received a facelift for 1988 and sales nearly doubled from the previous year, up to 33,210. Essentially, the revision lengthened the vehicles end caps, making the Eldorado  longer than in 1987; the wheelbase, doors, roof, and glass remained relatively unchanged and body panels were revised. Standard equipment included Cadillac's new 155 horsepower 4.5 liter V8. A comprehensive anti-lock braking system, developed by Teves, was newly available. Both front and rear fenders featured creased blade elements that rose slightly proud of the adjacent sheetmetal. Revisions included a new grille above the revamped front bumper, slightly protruding three-sided tail lamps and a revised rear bumper and trunk lid. Bladed 14-inch aluminum wheels remained standard, while an optional 15-inch snowflake-pattern alloy wheel was included with the touring suspension option.

The 1988 interior featured wider front seat headrests and swing-away door pull handles, replacing pull straps. New upholstery patterns, along with shoulder belts for outboard rear-seat passengers, appeared for both base and Biarritz models, with the latter returning to the tufted-button design – last seen in the 1985 Eldorado Biarritz. A new vinyl roof option, covering the full rooftop, featured a band of body color above the side door and windows – similar to the style used until 1978. This replaced the "cabriolet roof" option, which covered the rear half of the roof, introduced just a year earlier. With the Biarritz option package, the padded vinyl roof covered just the rear quarter of the rooftop, behind the rear side windows.  Biarritz also included slender vertical opera lamps, as in 1986 and 1987, but now added a spear molding (similar to the style used on the 1976–1985 Eldorado Biarritz) that ran from the base of the rooftop, continuing horizontally along the door, and down to the front fender tip. The standard power antenna was moved from the front passenger fender to the rear passenger fender. Nineteen shades of exterior paint were available (two more than the previous year). Pricing went up this year – to $24,891 ($ in  dollars ). This 1988 facelift would be the last until the Eldorado was completely redesigned for 1992.

1989
For this model year, the optional automatic rearview mirror transitioned from an electrically operated mechanical tilting mechanism to the new electrochromic style, using a clear fluid filled between the mirror and a thin sheet of glass, which tints on activation. A new exterior color, White Diamond, brought the color choices up to 18.  Gone were the 14-inch wheels, as the previously optional 15-inch "snowflake"-style aluminum wheel, introduced the previous year, was made standard for the base Eldorado. A compact disc player, available only with the Delco Bose Gold Series music system, was a new option this year, as were reversible floor mats, and gold-plated ornamentation ("Cadillac" grille and trunk scripts, sail panel ornaments, deck lid engine plaque, trunk lock cover, tail lamp emblems, and available wire wheel cover wreath and crest). New standard items included an express-down module for the driver's window, electronic oil-life indicator, a more powerful Delco Freedom II battery, a revised factory warranty, and GM's PASS (Passive Automotive Security System) KEY theft-deterrent system, which activated the fuel system based upon a coded pellet within the ignition key. Previously optional items that were now added as standard equipment included a cassette player with graphic equalizer, remote fuel filler door release, and a front license plate mounting. To deplete existing warehouse stock, the brushed chrome lower bodyside accent molding, optional through last year, was added as standard equipment for 1989 (revamped moldings would appear in 1990). New high-gloss Birdseye Maple trim (replacing the satin-finished American walnut used from 1986 to 1988) on the instrument panel and console was standard on Eldorado Biarritz, and available (for $245) on the base Eldorado. The optional full cabriolet roof, roughly simulating a convertible top, was offered in limited colors. Pricing rose again, now at $26,738 ($ in  dollars ). Production slipped slightly to 27,807 (including 7,174 Biarritz models). The dip in sales was partly due to competition from GM's own Buick Riviera, which grew 11 inches this year in a dramatic restyle, and had a production increase from 8,625 units in 1988 to 21,189 in 1989.

1990
A driver's side airbag was introduced as standard equipment, deleting the telescoping steering column was discontinued (although the tilt feature remained). Where cruise controls had been mounted on the center of the steering wheel, the air bag required a smaller diameter steering wheel, and controls moved to the turn signal stalk. A Touring Coupe trim level was introduced later in the model year. A new multi-point fuel injection replaced the throttle-body style from the previous model year, and horsepower rose from 155 to 180, requiring premium fuel. The front suspension stabilizer shaft was revised; "Snowflake" alloy wheel were standard, with an optional cast aluminum wheel design, not available with the touring suspension package; and the tire jack received a dedicated carpeted storage compartment in the trunk. 

Interior revisions included new molded seat trim panels, additional lateral and lumbar support, French seams, and revised front headrests. Full leather upholstery (formerly leather and cloth) became standard on the Biarritz trim level, and the base model lost seat-back map pockets. The cellular telephone was nolonger available, and the vinyl center armrest was revised The electronic climate control received three automatic and two manual settings. The optional leather upholstery package for the base model now included a power passenger seat recliner. 1990 models incorporated 1980's "Eldorado option package" as standard equipment, including revised carpeted floor mats, body-color door edge guards, illuminated driver and passenger visor, trunk mat, and an illuminated entry system.

Other previously optional equipment also became standard equipment, including the rear window defogger with heated outside mirrors and bodyside accent striping. New options included a central-unlocking feature (from the outside door locks using the key) added to the automatic door locks. For model year 1990, the rear deck lid carried a port fuel injection emblem, featured a chrome handle above the license plate opening and rear safety reflectors moved from the bumper onto the panel below the decklid.  A charcoal-color vinyl strip accented the chrome bumper and bodyside moldings, while the front bumper guards changed from body-color to charcoal.

MSRP for 1990 base model was $28,885 ($ in  dollars ) and for the Biarritz trim level an additional $3,180 ($ in  dollars ). Production dropped to 22,291 units, about 1/3 of which were the Biarritz trim and 1,507 were Eldorado touring coupe trim.

1991
As the final year for the eleventh generation, the 1991 Eldorado featured Cadillac's new 4.9 liter port fuel injection V-8 engine with GM's 4T60-E electronically controlled four-speed transmission. The Cadillac-exclusive "viscous converter clutch" provided smoother shifting under hard acceleration. Engine controls were monitored by the GMP4 powertrain control module (PCM), an on-board 64-kilobyte computer. A new exhaust set-up with a wider catalytic converter reduced restriction by 38% from last year, while the 0-60 mph speed went from 9 seconds in 1990 to 8.2 for 1991. Revised engine mounts decreased cabin noise and vibration. Adaptive suspension, marketed as Computer Command Ride (CCR), automatically adapted the suspension mode to vehicle speed for better handling and ride comfort; the system, optional on most other Cadillac models, was standard on Eldorado. The Bosch II anti-lock braking system, previously a $925 option, was made standard, as well as a more powerful 140-amp alternator.

A $309 electrically heated windshield was newly optional, as was the "security package" ($480 on base Eldorado, no charge on Biarritz or touring coupe) which now included remote keyless entry along with automatic door locks with central unlocking. A theft-deterrent system was optional, $480 on base Eldorado, no charge on Biarritz or touring coupe.  The windshield washer system was revised.

Base price was $31,245 ($ in  dollars ), a $2,400 increase from 1990. Several items became no-charge options on the base Eldorado, including a full vinyl roof covering or full-cabriolet (convertible-look) roof (an otherwise $1,095 option), leather upholstery with power passenger recliner, and the Delco-Bose sound system, with choice of CD or cassette. For 1991, the $2,050 touring coupe and the $3,180 Biarritz trim packages included a power moon roof and Delco-Bose stereo at no additional charge. 1991 was the final year for the Eldorado Biarritz. Production dropped to 16,212 (including 2,249 touring coupe models), the lowest for any Eldorado model since 1966.

Production totals

Twelfth generation (1992–2002)

The twelfth and final generation Eldorado introduced for 1992 was  longer and  wider than the previous generation, featuring frameless window glass. Marketed in either ESC (Eldorado Sport Coupe) and ETC (Eldorado Touring Coupe) trim, the former featured a stand-up hood ornament, Cadillac crests on the rear roof pillar, 16-inch multi-spoke alloy wheels, and concealed exhausts.

Shortly after introduction Cadillac's new Northstar V8 became available in both 270 and  variants, replacing the previous generation's  4.9 L L26.

Standard equipment included cloth upholstery, Zebrano wood trim, 6-way power front bucket seats, climate control, digital instrumentation, column-mounted gear selector, and three-position electronically adjustable "Speed-Sensitive Suspension". The ETC featured a grille-mounted Cadillac wreath and crest, "Touring Coupe" scripts on the doors, integrated fog lamps, flat-face 16-inch alloy wheels, and quad exhaust outlets. Its standard equipment included gathered leather seating areas, marketed as Nuance leather; 12-way power seats; Zebrano-trimmed floor console with gear selector, analog instrumentation, and specially tuned suspension.
 1993: The Touring Coupe received a two-spoke steering wheel, body-color grille, and 6-way seats, previously 12-way. An Eldorado Sport Coupe model was introduced, featuring the new Northstar V8 and quad exhaust, full-floor console with gear selector (without Zebrano trim), and touring-tuned adaptive suspension, now marketed as "Road Sensing Suspension". A passenger airbag became standard equipment on all models, the previously matte-black exterior side mirrors from 1992 were now body-color, and revised 16-inch chromed alloy wheels became available.
 1994: Eldorado and Eldorado Touring Coupe trims were offered. The steering wheel was revised to a four-spoke design. Both models now had quad exhausts. A new "Sport Appearance Package" option allowed the buyer to order most of the Touring Coupe's cosmetic features on the base Eldorado.
 1995: In 1995 the Eldorado featured revised front and rear bumpers, side cladding, chrome eggcrate grille, and seven-spoke alloy wheels.
 1996: The interior received a larger analog gauge cluster, relocated climate control system, and updated stereo faces. While the four-spoke steering wheel was a carry-over, new steering wheel-mounted duplicate climate and audio controls. The Touring Coupe offered perforated in leau of the gathered leather on other models. The Touring Coupe also received rain-sensing wipers marketed as "Rainsense", and once again a body-color radiator grille. Daytime running lights were standard.
 1997:  Microprocessor integration of engine, traction control, Stabilitrak electronic stability control, steering, and adaptive continuously variable road sensing suspension (CVRSS) became standard, marketed as Integrated Chassis Control System — similar to the Toyota/Lexus Vehicle Dynamics Integrated Management (VDIM).
 2000: With the Buick Riviera and Oldsmobile Toronado rebadged variants discontinued and the Seville and Deville sedan no longer sharing platforms, the Eldorado became GM's last production K- or E-body vehicle, and assembly was moved to the Lansing Craft Center.
 2001: As Eldorado's 50th model year, GM announced 2002 would be its last. To mark the end of the nameplate, a limited run of 1,596 cars in red or white—the colors available on the original 1953 convertible—were produced in three batches of 532, signifying the Eldorado's first year of production. These last cars featured specially tuned exhaust notes imitating the models, and a dash-mounted plaque indicating each car's sequence in production. Eldorado production ended on April 22, 2002 and was donated to the Cadillac Museum in honor of Cadillac dealer Don Massey. The Lansing Craft Center retooled to manufacture the Chevrolet SSR.

See also 
 Lincoln Mark Series
 Ford Thunderbird

References

Notes

Bibliography

External links

 Official Cadillac America Forum
Product information on:
 2002,
 2001 and
 2000 models.
 Cadillac Eldorado 1959 Review

Eldorado
Cars introduced in 1953
Convertibles
Coupés
Front-wheel-drive vehicles
Rear-wheel-drive vehicles
Sedans
Vehicles built in Lansing, Michigan
1960s cars
1970s cars
1980s cars
1990s cars
2000s cars
Motor vehicles manufactured in the United States
Personal luxury cars